The 1995 Critérium du Dauphiné Libéré was the 47th edition of the cycle race and was held from 4 June to 11 June 1995. The race started in Évian-les-Bains and finished in Chambéry. The race was won by Miguel Induráin of the Banesto team.

Teams
Fourteen teams, containing a total of 109 riders, participated in the race:

 Aguardiente Antioqueño–Lotería de Medellín
 
 
 
 
 
 Collstrop–Lystec
 
 
 
 Le Groupement

Route

Stages

Prologue
4 June 1995 – Évian-les-Bains,  (ITT)

Stage 1
5 June 1995 – Évian-les-Bains to Montalieu-Vercieu,

Stage 2
6 June 1995 – Charbonnières-les-Bains to Guilherand-Granges,

Stage 3
7 June 1995 – Tain-l'Hermitage to Tain-l'Hermitage,  (ITT)

Stage 4
8 June 1995 – Guilherand-Granges to Carpentras,

Stage 5
9 June 1995 – Avignon to Gap,

Stage 6
10 May 1995 – Briançon to Vaujany,

Stage 7
11 June 1995 – Vaujany to Chambéry,

General classification

References

1995
1995 in French sport
June 1995 sports events in Europe